Marlene Thomsen (born 5 May 1971) is a former badminton player from Denmark.

Career

1992 Summer Olympics
Thomsen competed in badminton at the 1992 Summer Olympics in women's doubles with Lisbet Stuer-Lauridsen. In the first round, they defeated Denyse Julien and Doris Piche of Canada 15-7, 15-7. In the second round they were beaten by the eventual silver medalist, Guan Weizhen and Nong Qunhua of China, 15-3, 15-12.

1996 Summer Olympics
She also competed in badminton at the 1996 Summer Olympics in women's doubles with Lisbet Stuer-Lauridsen. In the first round, they defeated Linda French and Erika von Heiland of the United States and in the second round Chung Jae-hee and Park Soo-yun of Korea. In quarterfinales they lost against Qin Yiyuan and Tang Yongshu of China 15-8, 15-3.

Major achievements

Sources
Smash - Marlene Thomsen

External links
Marlene Thomsen's Profile - Badminton.dk

1971 births
Living people
Danish female badminton players
Olympic badminton players of Denmark
Badminton players at the 1992 Summer Olympics
Badminton players at the 1996 Summer Olympics
People from Vejle Municipality
Sportspeople from the Region of Southern Denmark